Peter Duncan may refer to:

 Peter Duncan (actor) (born 1954), former Blue Peter presenter and former UK Chief Scout
 Peter Duncan (British politician) (born 1965), Scottish Conservative Party politician, former Member of Parliament
 Peter Duncan, American sea captain, see Navassa Island
 Peter Duncan (Australian politician) (born 1945), former member of the South Australian and Federal parliaments
 Peter Duncan (director) (born 1964), Australian filmmaker
 Peter Duncan (alpine skier) (born 1944), Canadian skier
 Peter Duncan (swimmer) (born 1935), South African Olympic swimmer
 Peter Duncan (footballer) (1890–1974), Scottish football inside left
 Peter Martin Duncan (1824–1891), English palaeontologist

See also